Keith Karl Compton (December 9, 1915 – June 15, 2004) was a U.S. Air Force lieutenant general who was vice commander in chief, Strategic Air Command, with headquarters at Offutt Air Force Base, Nebraska, where he fulfilled the responsibility of the commander in chief, Strategic Air Command, in his absence and acted as his principal assistant and advisor in the formulation of SAC policies, plans and directives.

Biography
Compton was born in 1915 in St. Joseph, Missouri, and graduated from Central High School there in 1933. He received his Bachelor of Arts degree from Westminster College at Fulton, Missouri, in 1937. He entered military service in February 1938 as an aviation cadet at Randolph Field, Texas, and received his pilot's wings a year later.

Compton spent the next two and a half years at Langley Field, Virginia, with the 2nd Bomb Wing, the first unit equipped with the B-17 Flying Fortress. In April 1942 he became commander of the 409th Bomb Squadron and later, at Fort Myers, Fla., operations officer for the 93rd Bomb Group.

In February 1943, Compton became commander of the 376th Bomb Group in Africa and, on August 1, 1943, led the disastrous air attack on the Ploesti oil refineries in Romania.

He was reassigned as assistant to the air chief of staff for operations, Fifteenth Air Force, in North Africa in March 1944 and returned to the United States in July that year as assistant deputy chief of staff for operations and training, Second Air Force, Colorado Springs, Colorado.

Following several command assignments and graduation from the Air University, Compton was assigned in June 1948 to the Air Proving Ground Command, Eglin Air Force Base, Florida, as deputy for operations, a position he held until February 1953. It was during this tour of duty that Compton, flying an F-86 Sabrejet, won the National Air Races Bendix Trophy for 1951, setting a new national speed record for the route.

In February 1953, Compton transferred to Strategic Air Command (SAC). Several successful command assignments in SAC resulted in his designation in September 1961 as SAC director of operations. In June 1963 he became SAC's chief of staff.

In August 1964 he was assigned to be the Inspector General of the U.S. Air Force. Six months later he was designated the deputy chief of staff for plans and operations, Headquarters U.S. Air Force. With these duties he also became the Air Force's operations deputy sitting with the Joint Chiefs of Staff for the chief of staff, U.S. Air Force. He assumed his last position in February 1967. He retired August 1, 1969.

Military decorations awarded Compton include the Distinguished Service Cross, Air Force Distinguished Service Medal with oak leaf cluster, Legion of Merit with oak leaf cluster, Distinguished Flying Cross with oak leaf cluster, Air Medal with nine oak leaf clusters, the Air Force and the Army Commendation medals. In addition he holds his college's outstanding Alumni Achievement Award and is one of the few holders of aviation's famed Bendix Trophy.

An avid golfer, Compton won the 1978 U.S. Senior Amateur, 1 up, over Maj Gen John W. Kline and in 1980 finished runner-up to William C. Campbell.

References
American Combat Airman Hall of Fame

1915 births
2004 deaths
United States Air Force officers
Personnel of Strategic Air Command
People from St. Joseph, Missouri
Westminster College (Missouri) alumni
Recipients of the Air Force Distinguished Service Medal
Recipients of the Legion of Merit
Recipients of the Distinguished Flying Cross (United States)
Recipients of the Air Medal
United States Army Air Forces bomber pilots of World War II
American aviation record holders
American male golfers
Amateur golfers